Fernando Bascopé Müller (born 4 April 1962) is a Bolivian Roman Catholic titular bishop. 

Müller was born in Bolivia and was ordained to the priesthood in 1991. He served as titular bishop of Naratcata and as auxiliary bishop of the Roman Catholic Diocese of El Alto from 2010 to 2014. He has served as bishop of Military Ordinariate of Bolivia since 2014.

Notes

1964 births
Living people
21st-century Roman Catholic bishops in Bolivia
Roman Catholic bishops of El Alto
Roman Catholic military bishops of Bolivia